George Beauchamp Vick (1901–1975), known as G. B. Vick, or G. Beauchamp Vick, was pastor of Temple Baptist Church of Detroit, Michigan, from 1950 to the 1970s. J. Frank Norris, pastor of Temple Baptist from 1934 to 1950, appointed Vick in 1935 to help him manage the church, as Norris himself traveled between it and First Baptist Church in Fort Worth, Texas. In 1950, Vick had a falling out with Norris and became solitary pastor of Temple Baptist. Vick and others disillusioned with the direction Norris had taken, founded the Baptist Bible Fellowship International and Baptist Bible College in Springfield, Missouri.

Vick was a staunch segregationist, grounding his racism in the Bible. "God warned repeatedly in the Old Testament against Israel's mixture with other races and we believe that it is not only unwise but unchristian to thus cause confusion by mixture of the races," he wrote. Accordingly, Blacks were not allowed to join the church during his tenure, a whites-only policy that continued after him until 1986. Indeed, the church building on Grand River Avenue became during the mid-1950s a center of white resistance to integration of Detroit neighborhoods.

Church history and buildings
Temple Baptist Church began as one congregation in 1921 with a merger between the Fourteenth Avenue Baptist Society [1892–1921] and the Grand River Avenue Baptist Church, both of Detroit, the Church was renamed and many of its former members left after the appointment of Brad Powell as Pastor in 1991, some time after which the Church was renamed as NorthRidge Church, removing "Baptist" from the title.

This church, having experienced many dramatic changes under Powell continues meeting at its large edifice in 49555 North Territorial Road, Plymouth, Michigan (a far-western suburb of Detroit, closer to Ann Arbor), where Temple had moved to due to dramatic growth preceding 1951 under both Vick and Norris which necessitated the vacation and sale (to a black congregation, King Solomon Baptist Church) of the former two meetinghouses on the corner of 6105, 14th Street in Detroit; the 5,000-seat auditorium of which, built in 1937 for Temple,  is today the meeting-place of Starr of Zion Missionary Baptist Church, however King Solomon Baptist still owns both buildings, including the original church building of Fourteenth Avenue Baptist Church, built in 1917.

References

Sources

 Brackney, William H. Historical Dictionary of the Baptists. 2nd ed. Historical Dictionaries of Religions, Philosophies, and Movements 94. Lanham: Scarecrow Press, 2009. 
 Hankins, Barry. God’s Rascal: J. Frank Norris and the Beginnings of Southern Fundamentalism. Lexington: The University Press of Kentucky, 1996.

1901 births
1975 deaths
American evangelicals
Independent Baptist ministers from the United States
People from Russellville, Kentucky
People from Logan County, Kentucky
People from Fort Worth, Texas
People from Springfield, Missouri
Clergy from Detroit
People from Wayne County, Michigan
American Christian creationists
Christian fundamentalists
Baptists from Michigan
Baptists from Kentucky
20th-century Baptist ministers from the United States